Celtiberian may refer to:

 Celtiberians, a Celtic people of the Iberian Peninsula
 Celtiberian language, a Celtic language

Language and nationality disambiguation pages